Manapuram may refer to:

 China Manapuram a village panchayat in Gantyada mandal in Vizianagaram district in Andhra Pradesh
 Peda Manapuram, is a village panchayat in Dattirajeru mandal of Vizianagaram district in Andhra Pradesh